The Amazing Race is a reality television franchise.

The Amazing Race may also refer to:

The Amazing Race (American TV series), the original American version of the show
The Amazing Race Asia, an Asian version of the show
The Amazing Race (Latin America) (formerly known as The Amazing Race en Discovery Channel), a Latin American version of the show
The Amazing Race: A Corrida Milionária, a Brazilian version of the show
The Amazing Race: China Rush, a Chinese version of the show
HaMerotz LaMillion, an Israeli version of the show
The Amazing Race Australia, an Australian version of the show
The Amazing Race Norge, a Norwegian version of the show
Amazing Race (French TV series), a French version of the show
The Amazing Race Philippines, a Philippine version of the show
The Amazing Race Vietnam, a Vietnamese version of the show
The Amazing Race Canada, a Canadian version of the show

See also
Amazing Grace (disambiguation)
The Great Race
The Amazing Place, a fictional reality show in Heartbreak Hotel (The Simpsons).